Myron Daniel Healey (June 8, 1923 – December 21, 2005) was an American actor. He began his career in  Hollywood, California during the early 1940s and eventually made hundreds of appearances in movies and on television during a career spanning more than half a century.

Early years
Healey was born in Petaluma in Sonoma County, California, the son of Dr. and Mrs. Robert D. Healey. He served in World War II as an Air Corps navigator and bombardier, flying in B-26 Martin Marauders in the European Theatre. After the war he continued  military duties, retiring in the early 1960s as a captain in the United States Air Force Reserve.

Acting career
Healey's film debut came in 1943 with Young Ideas.

Returning to film work after the war, Healey played villains and henchmen in low-budget Western films. He also did some screenwriting. In the post-war period he was frequently seen in Westerns from Monogram Pictures, often starring Johnny Mack Brown, Jimmy Wakely and Whip Wilson.

In the 1950s Healey moved to more "bad guy" roles in other films, including the Bomba and Jungle Jim series, crime dramas and more westerns. He portrayed the bandit Bob Dalton in an episode of the syndicated television series Stories of the Century, starring and narrated by Jim Davis. In 1955 he played a "good guy" for a change as Phyllis Coates' partner in the 1955 Republic Pictures serial Panther Girl of the Kongo.

Earlier in 1952, Healey was cast in one of the first episodes of the syndicated television anthology series, Death Valley Days, hosted by the "Old Ranger" (Stanley Andrews). Healey played mining engineer Frank Johnson, a once-reluctant suitor who encounters his former love interest.

Healey appeared seven times as Capt. Bandcroft in The Adventures of Kit Carson (1951–55). He was cast twice in 1957-58 as Becker in two episodes of the ABC/Warner Brothers western series Colt .45 starring Wayde Preston, seven times (1950–57) in the long-running The Lone Ranger, and ten times (1952–55) in The Roy Rogers Show television series.

Healey played the outlaw Johnny Ringo in the western television series Tombstone Territory, with Pat Conway as Sheriff Clay Hollister, in the episode "Johnny Ringo's Last Ride" with a teleplay by Sam Peckinpah. He appeared in an episode of the children's western series Buckskin, which aired on NBC from 1958 to 1959. He was a semi-regular on programs produced by Gene Autry's Flying A production company: Annie Oakley, Buffalo Bill, Jr., The Range Rider, and The Gene Autry Show. He also guest-starred on the crime drama with a modern Western setting, The Sheriff of Cochise, starring John Bromfield, and in the Western set in the 1840s, Riverboat, starring Darren McGavin. He also appeared in an episode of the second season of Zorro.

Between 1960 and 1963, Healey appeared five times on the NBC western Laramie, starring John Smith and Robert Fuller. He appeared ten times on another NBC western, The Virginian, and four times on Laredo.  He also made appearances on Gunsmoke.

From 1959 to 1961, he played Maj. Peter Horry, top aide to Leslie Nielsen, in the miniseries Swamp Fox on Walt Disney Presents, based on the American Revolutionary War hero Francis Marion.

In 1970 Healey appeared as Wardlow in the TV western "The Men From Shiloh" (the rebranded name of The Virginian) in the episode titled "Jenny".

Collectively, Healey appeared in some 140 films, including 81 westerns and three serials. Among his non-western pictures, he appeared in at least two horror films: the Americanized version of the Japanese giant-monster movie Varan the Unbelievable (1958) and The Incredible Melting Man (1977).

Death
In 2005, Healey broke his hip in a fall and never recovered. He died at the age of 82 at a  hospital near his home in Simi Valley, California.

Recognition
In 2000, Healey received a Golden Boot Award for his contributions to Western films and television programs.

Selected filmography
Feature films include

 Young Ideas (1943) - Student (uncredited)
 Salute to the Marines (1943) - Gunner (uncredited)
 Swing Shift Maisie (1943) - Young Pilot (uncredited)
 Thousands Cheer (1943) - Soldier at Train Station with Polish Girl (uncredited)
 I Dood It (1943) - Page Boy (uncredited)
 The Iron Major (1943) - Paul Cavanaugh (uncredited)
 See Here, Private Hargrove (1944) - Lieutenant (uncredited)
 Meet the People (1944) - Marine (uncredited)
 The Time of Their Lives (1946) - Dandy at Party (uncredited)
 Crime Doctor's Man Hunt (1946) - Philip Armstrong / John Foster (uncredited)
 That Brennan Girl (1946) - Party Guest (uncredited)
 Blondie's Big Moment (1947) - Pipe-Smoking Office Worker (uncredited)
 Millie's Daughter (1947) - Attendant (uncredited)
 Buck Privates Come Home (1947) - Tech Sergeant - Medic #5 (uncredited)
 The Corpse Came C.O.D. (1947) - Reporter (uncredited)
 Down to Earth (1947) - Sloan - Pilot (uncredited)
 It Had to Be You (1947) - Gardner Huntington Standish (uncredited)
Tall, Dark and Gruesome (1948, Short) - Partygoer in devil's costume
 I, Jane Doe (1948) - Intern (uncredited)
 Blondie's Reward (1948) - Cluett Day
 Walk a Crooked Mile (1948) - FBI Agent Thompson (uncredited)
 The Return of October (1948) - Assistant Lawyer (uncredited)
 You Gotta Stay Happy (1948) - Day Clerk (uncredited)
 Hidden Danger (1948) - James Carson
 Wake of the Red Witch (1948) - 'Red Witch' Seaman (uncredited)
 Ladies of the Chorus (1948) - Randy's Cousin (uncredited)
 The Man from Colorado (1949) - Powers (uncredited)
 Slightly French (1949) - Stevens (uncredited)
 Knock on Any Door (1949) - Assistant District Attorney (uncredited)
 Gun Law Justice (1949) - Jensen
 Trails End (1949) - Drake
Across the Rio Grande (1949) - Stage Holdup Man
Laramie (1949) - Lt. Reed (uncredited)
Batman and Robin (1949, Serial) - Walker - Policeman [Ch. 7] (uncredited)
Air Hostess (1949) - Ralph
Brand of Fear (1949) - Jeffers
The Wyoming Bandit (1949) - Tom Howard (uncredited)
Range Justice (1949) - Murdered Henchman
South of Rio (1949) - Marshal Travis
Mr. Soft Touch (1949) - Doctor (uncredited)
Haunted Trails (1949) - Henchman Lassiter
Western Renegades (1949) - Henchman Gus
Rusty's Birthday (1949) - Jack Wiggins (uncredited)
Riders of the Dusk (1949) - Sheriff Jim
Pioneer Marshal (1949) - Larry Devlin
Lawless Code (1949) - Donald Martin
Fence Riders (1950) - Cameo Krogan
Trail of the Rustlers (1950) - Ben Mahoney (uncredited)
West of Wyoming (1950) - Brodie
Over the Border (1950) - Jeff Grant
A Woman of Distinction (1950) - Cameraman (uncredited)
Kill the Umpire (1950) - Train Conductor Operator (uncredited)
No Sad Songs for Me (1950) - Chris's Young Man (uncredited)
Salt Lake Raiders (1950) - Fred Mason
In a Lonely Place (1950) - Post Office Clerk (uncredited)
Timber Fury (1950) - Paxton Man (uncredited)
Federal Man (1950) - The Tracking Device Specialist (uncredited)
Hi-Jacked (1950) - Police Broadcaster
I Killed Geronimo (1950) - Henchman Frank Corcoran
The Fuller Brush Girl (1950) - Employee (uncredited)
My Blue Heaven (1950) - Adoptive Father (uncredited)
Law of the Panhandle (1950) - Henry Faulkner
Between Midnight and Dawn (1950) - Officer Davis (uncredited)
Hot Rod (1950) - Joe Langham - Policeman
Emergency Wedding (1950) - Guest (uncredited)
Experiment Alcatraz (1950) - Wire Service Reporter (uncredited)
Outlaw Gold (1950) - Sonny Lang
Short Grass (1950) - Les McCambridge
Colorado Ambush (1951) - Chet Murdock
Al Jennings of Oklahoma (1951) - Confederate Corporal (uncredited)
Baby Sitters Jitters (1951, Short) - George Lloyd
Night Riders of Montana (1951) - Steve Bauer
I Was an American Spy (1951) - American Soldier in Jeep (uncredited)
Roar of the Iron Horse (1951, Serial) - Ace -Henchman [Chs.3,4,6,9,10,15]
Lorna Doone (1951) - Todd Darcy (uncredited)
The Texas Rangers (1951) - Texas Ranger Captain Peak (uncredited)
Montana Desperado (1951) - Ron Logan
Bonanza Town (1951) - Krag Boseman
Journey Into Light (1951) - Jerry - the Cop
Slaughter Trail (1951) - Heath (uncredited)
Drums in the Deep South (1951) - Union Lieutenant (uncredited)
Elephant Stampede (1951) - Joe Collins
The Longhorn (1951) - Andy
The Wild Blue Yonder (1951) - Man on Tower (voice, uncredited)
Silver City (1951) - Bleek (uncredited)
The Big Night (1951) - Kennealy
Fort Osage (1952) - Martin Christensen
Rodeo (1952) - Richard Durston
Montana Territory (1952) - Bill Landers
Storm Over Tibet (1952) - Bill March
The Kid from Broken Gun (1952) - Kiefer
Fargo (1952) - Red Olsen
Apache War Smoke (1952) - Pike Curtis
Desperadoes' Outpost (1952) - Lieutenant Dan Booker
Monsoon (1952) - Rault
The Maverick (1952) - Sergeant Frick
Kansas Pacific (1953) - Morey
White Lightning (1953) - Nelson
Son of Belle Starr (1953) - Sheriff Hansen
The Moonlighter (1953) - Deputy Joe Bayliss (uncredited)
Saginaw Trail (1953) - Miller Webb
Fighting Lawman (1953) - Sheriff Dave Wilson
Combat Squad (1953) - Marley
Hot News (1953) - Jim O'Hara
Vigilante Terror (1953) - Brett
Private Eyes (1953) - Carl, Rose Hill Attendant
Texas Bad Man (1953) - Jackson
Rails Into Laramie (1954) - Con Winton
Silver Lode (1954) - Rider (uncredited)
They Rode West (1954) - Maj. 'Van' Vandergrift (uncredited)
Cattle Queen of Montana (1954) - Hank
Gang Busters (1955) - as John Omar Pinson (FBI's 4th most wanted fugitive)
Panther Girl of the Kongo (1955) - Larry Sanders
African Manhunt (1955) - Capt. Bob Kirby
Man Without a Star (1955) - Mogollon (uncredited)
Rage at Dawn (1955) - John Reno
The Man from Bitter Ridge (1955) - Clem Jackman
Ma and Pa Kettle at Waikiki (1955) - Marty - Kidnapper (uncredited)
Jungle Moon Men (1955) - Mark Santo
Tennessee's Partner (1955) - Reynolds
Count Three and Pray (1955) - Floyd Miller
Dig That Uranium (1955) - Joe Hody
Slightly Scarlet (1956) - Wison - Caspar Thug (uncredited)
The First Texan (1956) - Capt. Martin (uncredited)
Magnificent Roughnecks (1956) - Werner Jackson
The Young Guns (1956) - Deputy Nix
Calling Homicide (1956) - Jim Haddix
The White Squaw (1956) - Eric Swanson
Running Target (1956) - Kaygo
Hell's Crossroads (1957) - Cole Younger
Shoot-Out at Medicine Bend (1957) - Rafe Sanders
Lure of the Swamp (1957)
The Restless Breed (1957) - Sheriff Mike Williams
The Unearthly (1957) - Mark Houston
Undersea Girl (1957) - Eric 'Swede' Nelson, Gang Member
The Hard Man (1957) - Ray Hendry (uncredited)
Escape from Red Rock (1957) - Joe Skinner
Cavalry Command (1958) - Lt. Worth
Cole Younger, Gunfighter (1958) - Phil Bennett / Charlie Bennett
Quantrill's Raiders (1958) - Jarrett
Apache Territory (1958) - Webb
Onionhead (1958) - Leggas (uncredited)
Rio Bravo (1959) - Barfly (uncredited)
Ma Barker's Killer Brood (1960) - Sioux Falls Bank Robber (uncredited)
The George Raft Story (1961) - Joel Creelman (uncredited)
Convicts 4 (1962) - Gunther
Varan the Unbelievable (1962) - Cmdr. James Bradley
He Rides Tall (1964) - Marshal Ed Loomis (uncredited)
Mirage (1965) - Bar Patron Discussing Watermelon (voice, uncredited)
Harlow (1965) - Rex Chambers (uncredited)
The Swinger (1966) - Reporter (uncredited)
Gunfight in Abilene (1967) - Ingles (uncredited)
Journey to Shiloh (1968) - Sheriff Briggs
The Shakiest Gun in the West (1968) - Stage Passenger (uncredited)
True Grit (1969) - deputy at prisoner unloading (uncredited)
The Computer Wore Tennis Shoes (1969) - Police Detective (uncredited)
The Cheyenne Social Club (1970) - Deuter
Which Way to the Front? (1970) - Army Major Doctor (uncredited)
Smoke in the Wind (1975) - Mort Fagan
The Incredible Melting Man (1977) - General Michael Perry
Claws (1977) - Sheriff
The Other Side of the Mountain Part 2 (1978) - Doctor in Bishop
Goodbye, Franklin High (1978) - Walter Craig
Forever and Beyond (1983) - Nicholas
Ghost Fever (1986) - Andrew Lee
Pulse (1988) - Howard
Little Giants (1994) - Doctor (final film role)

Other western appearances include

The Cisco Kid (1951-1954) - Jim Gault / Don White / E.B. Johnson / Sloan /  Drake - Henchman
The Adventures of Rin Tin Tin (1955-1956) - Morrel / Odds-On O'Connor / Jesse Harkness
Cheyenne (1955-1961) - Tully / Wesley Mason / Chip Claney / Lew Lattimer / Carl Thompson
Sheriff of Cochise (1956) - Dillon
Judge Roy Bean (1956) - John Gorman / Hurley / Jake Winters / Bert Reno
State Trooper (1957-1959) - Big Nels / Ed Benson / Red Shawn
Maverick (1958-1961) - Frank Mercer / Jed Benedict / Jim Mundy
Wagon Train (1958-1964) - Wayne Rossen / Sgt. Bob Rollins / Doc Curley / Mr. O'Neal / Deputy Sheriff / Sgt. Oakes / Steve Wilson / Bill Miller
Cimarron City (1959) - Clayton Buckley
Bat Masterson (1959) - Col. Marc James in “To The Manner Born” and Jack Latigo in “Lottery of Death”.
The Texan (1959-1960) - Gait Gaylor / Clay Calder / Sheriff Ed Courtney
Rawhide (1959-1962) - Willie / Lou Calvert / Jeb / Gun Guard
The Alaskans (1960) - Fred Simmons
The Rebel (1961) - Mac McGowan
Whispering Smith (1961) - Jim Conley
Gunsmoke (1962) - Mike / Jake Moseley
Have Gun - Will Travel (1963) - Stennis
The Dakotas (1963) - Sheriff
The Virginian (1963-1970) - Wardlow / Lt. Mike Buehl / 2nd Drifter / Potts / Blue / Lomax / Sgt. Cohane / Jack Slauson / Yance Cooper / Martin Croft
Bonanza (1964-1968) - Zeb Williams / Johannsen / Sam / Buck
Daniel Boone (1964 TV series) - S2/E12 "The First Beau" - (1965) - Mike Kravic
Daniel Boone (1965-1969) - James Burns / Lynch / Mike Kravic
The Road West (1967) - Big Foot
The Guns of Will Sonnett (1967-1969) - Jack Curson / Sheriff Flagg / Lank Turner
Kung Fu (1973) - Capt. Malachy

Non-western appearances include
Adventures of Superman (1955-1956) - Capt. Mud / Paul Craymore / Gunner Flinch
Behind Closed Doors (1958) - Lister
Sea Hunt (1958-1960) - US Coast Guard Commander Jack Carter / Russ Hodges
Perry Mason (1959) - Howard Roper
Tightrope (1960) - Al Cummings
Bourbon Street Beat (1960) - Sheriff Clay Tarbo
Dante (1961) - Johnny Poco
The Islanders (1961) - Hightower
The Alfred Hitchcock Hour (1962-1965) - George Foyle / Dave Connor / Peter Rogan / Bob Blake
The Three Stooges
Adam-12 October 1970 - Purse Snatcher, Carl Tremain
Spider-Man: The Dragon's Challenge (1981) - Lieutenant Olson

References

External links
B-Westerns/villains

1923 births
2005 deaths
20th-century American male actors
People from Petaluma, California
Male actors from California
American male film actors
American male television actors
Male film serial actors
People from Simi Valley, California
United States Army Air Forces personnel of World War II
United States Army Air Forces officers
Western (genre) television actors
United States Air Force officers
United States Air Force reservists
Military personnel from California